Esmail Jalayer was an Iranian painter notable artist of Naser al-Din Shah Qajar reign era (1848-1896). He was peculiarly well known for his works in two admired dissimilar classes of Qajar paintings. irāni-sāzi (focusing on Iranian templates, sketching on face-related aspects, make-up, costume, and comparatively unchanged by European influences) and ṭabiʿat-sāzi (concentrating on fauna and flora in a European realistic mode, targeting at realism). Esmail was the son of Haj Mohammad Khan Jalayer Kalati from a former and renowned family of Khorasan but there are no accurate details about the dates of his birth and death or location of the interment. Furthermore, just a few of his works have been written a date: one is a portrait of Naser al-Din Shah Qajar in watercolor, dated 1862, others include a depiction of a scene from the Anglo-Persian War (1856) companions and those of the founders and luminaries of Sufi sects and dervishes.

References
 JALĀYER, ESMĀʿIL KHAN iranicaonline.org 21/12/2019

People from Khorasan
People of Qajar Iran
19th-century Iranian painters